The Art of Electronics, by Paul Horowitz and Winfield Hill, is a popular reference textbook dealing with analog and digital electronics. The first edition was published in 1980, and the 1989 second edition has been regularly reprinted. 
The third edition was published on April 9, 2015. The author is accepting reports of errata and publishing them, to be corrected in future revisions.

Overview
The book covers many areas of circuit design, from basic DC voltage, current, and resistance, to active filters and oscillators, to digital electronics, including microprocessors and digital bus interfacing. It also includes discussions of such often-neglected areas as high-frequency, high-speed design techniques and low-power applications.

The book includes many example circuits. In addition to having examples of good circuits, it also has examples of bad ideas, with discussions of what makes the good designs good and the bad ones bad. It can be described as a cross between a textbook and reference manual, though without the chapter-end questions and exercises which are often found in textbooks.

There is also a complementary text, Learning the Art of Electronics – A Hands-On Lab Course (formerly Student Manual for The Art of Electronics) by Thomas C. Hayes and Paul Horowitz. While referring to the main text extensively, it is designed specifically to teach electronics. It contains laboratory exercises and explanatory text supplements aimed at the student. In contrast, The Art of Electronics contains tables, equations, diagrams, and other material practitioners use for reference.

The Art of Electronics: The X Chapters follow up book was released in January 2020.

References

External links
 Official web page

Electronics books
Cambridge University Press books
1980 non-fiction books